David J. Remnick (born October 29, 1958) is an American journalist, writer, and editor. He won a Pulitzer Prize in 1994 for his book Lenin's Tomb: The Last Days of the Soviet Empire, and is also the author of Resurrection and King of the World: Muhammad Ali and the Rise of an American Hero. Remnick has been editor of The New Yorker magazine since 1998. He was named "Editor of the Year" by Advertising Age in 2000. Before joining The New Yorker, Remnick was a reporter and the Moscow correspondent for The Washington Post. He also has served on the New York Public Library board of trustees and is a member of the American Philosophical Society. In 2010, he published his sixth book, The Bridge: The Life and Rise of Barack Obama.

Background
Remnick was born to a Jewish family in Hackensack, New Jersey, the son of Barbara (Seigel), an art teacher, and Edward C. Remnick, a dentist. He was raised in Hillsdale, New Jersey, in a Jewish home with, he has said, "a lot of books around." He attended Yavneh Academy in Paramus. Remnick was also a childhood friend of comedian Bill Maher. He attended Pascack Valley High School in Hillsdale. At Pascack Valley High School he studied Russian and was thereby inspired to also study the politics and culture of the USSR.

He was graduated summa cum laude from Princeton University in 1981 with an A.B. in comparative literature; there he met writer John McPhee, was a member of the University Press Club, and helped found The Nassau Weekly. Remnick completed a 122-page-long senior thesis titled "The Sympathetic Thread: 'Leaves of Grass' 1855-1865." Remnick has implied that after college he wanted to write novels, but due to the illnesses of his parents, he needed to get a job. Wanting to be a writer, he took a job at The Washington Post.

Career

The Washington Post

Remnick began his reporting career at The Washington Post in 1982 shortly after his graduation from Princeton. His first assignment was to cover the United States Football League. After six years, in 1988 he became the newspaper's Moscow correspondent, which provided him with the material for Lenin's Tomb. He also received the George Polk Award for excellence in journalism in 1993.

The New Yorker

Remnick became a staff writer at The New Yorker in September 1992, after ten years at The Washington Post.

Remnick's 1997 New Yorker article "Kid Dynamite Blows Up", about boxer Mike Tyson, was nominated for a National Magazine Award. In July 1998, he became editor, succeeding Tina Brown. Remnick promoted Hendrik Hertzberg, a former Jimmy Carter speechwriter and former editor of The New Republic, to write the lead pieces in "Talk of the Town", the magazine's opening section. In 2005, Remnick earned $1 million for his work as the magazine's editor.

In 2003, Remnick penned an editorial in The New Yorker in the lead-up to the Iraq War saying "the United States has been wrong, politically and morally, about Iraq more than once in the past... but... a return to a hollow pursuit of containment will be the most dangerous option of all." In the months leading up to the war, the magazine also published several articles connecting Saddam Hussein to al-Qaida, often relying on unnamed sources, or simply the claims of Secretary of Defense Donald Rumsfeld, as evidence. The magazine received some criticism for their journalism during this period. The claims that Hussein and al-Qaida had a close operational relationship were false, as confirmed by numerous sources including a U.S military study in 2008.

In 2004, for the first time in its 80-year history, The New Yorker endorsed a presidential candidate, John Kerry.

In May 2009, Remnick was the subject of an extended Twitter thread by former New Yorker staff writer Dan Baum, whose contract with the magazine was not renewed by Remnick. The tweets, written over the course of a week, described the difficult relationship between Baum and Remnick, his editor.

Remnick's biography of President Barack Obama, The Bridge: The Life and Rise of Barack Obama, was released on April 6, 2010. It features hundreds of interviews with friends, colleagues, and other witnesses to Obama's rise to the presidency of the United States.

In 2010, Remnick lent his support to the campaign urging the release of Sakineh Mohammadi Ashtiani, the Iranian woman sentenced to death by stoning after being convicted of adultery and ordering the murder of her husband by her lover.

Remnick provided guest commentary and contributed to NBC coverage of the 2014 Winter Olympics in Sochi Russia, including the opening ceremony and commentary for NBC News.

Remnick is also the host of The New Yorker Radio Hour, produced by WNYC and The New Yorker.

In May 2014, Remnick served as the commencement speaker at the 160th commencement of Syracuse University.

Personal life

In 1987, Remnick married reporter Esther Fein in a Jewish ceremony at the Lincoln Square Synagogue in Manhattan. Fein has worked as a reporter for The New York Times and The Washington Post. The couple has three children, Alex, Noah, and Natasha. Remnick is fluent in Russian.

Works

See also
 New Yorkers in journalism

References

External links 
 David Remnick at The New Yorker
 
 
 Interview list
 
 Interview in British magazine New Statesman
 "Big Think Interview with David Remnick". Transcript and audio-video recording (36:23) with index. Big Think. Retrieved November 2, 2013. 
 Interview in Spanish magazine Jot down, August 2013
 Covering Trump: what happens when journalism, politics, and fake news collide, a discussion during a live chat at the Columbia Journalism Review with the Guardian and Reuters discussing the dangers of normalizing a Donald Trump presidency, March 2017
 

1958 births
Living people
American male journalists
American magazine editors
Jewish American writers
Writers from Hackensack, New Jersey
Pascack Valley High School alumni
People from Hillsdale, New Jersey
Princeton University alumni
Pulitzer Prize for General Non-Fiction winners
The New Yorker people
The New Yorker editors
The New Yorker staff writers
The Washington Post people
Writers about the Soviet Union
20th-century American non-fiction writers
21st-century American non-fiction writers
20th-century American male writers
CNN people
21st-century American male writers
Members of the American Academy of Arts and Letters